Newport is a suburb of northern Sydney in the state of New South Wales, Australia, in the local government area of Northern Beaches Council. It is part of the Northern Beaches region.

History
Prior to European colonisation, the Newport area was inhabited by the Guringai (Kuringgai) people. Shell middens from Aboriginal inhabitants are still visible both on the Pittwater side in Salt Pan Cove, as well as on the ocean facing cliff-side banks.

Newport derived its name from being a "new port" for steamers carrying passengers and cargo such as local shell lime and firewood. Bungan Castle is a medieval-style stone castle on Bungan Head built in 1919 by Adolph Albers, a German art dealer. In 1978, the area came to national attention due to the disappearance of Trudie Adams.

Population
In the 2016 Census, there were 9,301 people in Newport.  74.3% of people were born in Australia. The next most common countries of birth were England 7.2%, New Zealand 2.1% and South Africa 1.3%. 89.3% of people spoke only English at home. The most common responses for religion were No Religion 36.7%, Anglican 22.0% and Catholic 19.7%.

Geography

Newport sits between the Pacific Ocean to the east and Pittwater to the west. A major road along the peninsula is Barrenjoey Road.

Its ocean beach is patrolled by Newport Surf Life Saving Club. On the shores of Pittwater are several marinas and small shipyards, including the Royal Prince Alfred Yacht Club and the Royal Motor Yacht Club, serving mainly pleasure craft. Newport also features many cafes and restaurants, as well as the Newport Arms Hotel on the shore of Pittwater.

Churches

Presbyterian
 Pittwater Presbyterian Church has been ministering to the people of Newport and the surrounding suburbs since 1967. Sermons are given by Phil Rawlings and Jeff Kendal. Services commence on Sundays at 9:30 am.

Anglican
Newport Anglican Church meets right next to the Post Office at 9.30am on Sundays. The Senior Minister was Rev. Jason Ramsay from 2007 to Christmas 2019.

The Link Church meets at its North Campus the first Wednesday of every Month at the Newport Community Centre. Service begins at 7pm. The Link Church also runs Sunday morning and evening Services at Cromer and Narrabeen respectively.

Sport clubs
 Newport Breakers Rugby Club
 Newport Breakers Netball Club
 Newport Surf Life Saving Club

Schools
 Newport Public School

Localities

 Bungan Head
 Salt Pan Cove

References

  
Suburbs of Sydney
Beaches of New South Wales
Northern Beaches Council